Mohsen Ayed Hammoud Sultan, known as Tahish HAWBAN is an author, journalist and human rights activist. He was born in Yemen in 1976 in isolation Tbahah, Ta'izz Governorate.

Qualifications

 Bachelor of Agriculture – University of Sanaa .
 Computer Diploma from the Institute of Teacher Education .
 Diploma in civil society .
 Diploma in Business Administration .
 Diploma in Applied Software .
 Diploma in Accounting .
 Diploma in Marketing and art sales .
 Courses in civil society and the media and the democratic transformation and remote training and open education .

Novels
His novel entitled victims

Current workplace
 Newspaper editor Tahish HAWBAN .
 Coach programs qualitative sector training and rehabilitation ministry of Education

Previous jobs
 Executive Director of the Institute for the Development of Yemeni democracy.
 Executive Director of the Future Movement .
Currently is writing a novel titled " victims

Life
Journalist Mohsen Ayed is one of the most controversial journalists in Yemen because of his opinion in the political and religious issues
Because of his revolution against the veil, customs and traditions in Yemen Journalist Mohsen Ayed announced his revolution on the customs and traditions of Yemen and has published his picture with his wife in intimate way
His wife also was not wearing the Islamic veil and the effects of this act angered many clerics and Islamist fanatics in Yemen

Takfir Fatwas
In February 2012 issued a religious figure against 69 clerics in Yemen fatwas atone accuse him of blasphemy in which the clergy and offended Islam and the divine Contributed to these fatwas to differentiate between him and his wife and children 
Asked his wife Khula him because he left the Islamic religion To do so based on these fatwas issued against clerics in Yemen 
They also made life fatwas journalist Mohsen Ayed danger
 But here he was gentle with great sympathy and said five Yemeni women desire to marry him in such a crisis that was going through.

References

Yemeni writers
Yemeni journalists
1976 births
Living people